Rebelution is Tanya Stephens' sixth album, released more than two years after her last release, Gangsta Blues. Production came from (among others) her boyfriend & life partner Andrew Henton.

Track listing

All acoustic tracks & music videos from the DVD are from Rebelution unless otherwise stated.

Personnel
Andrew Henton - drums/production
Rick Sabo - guitar
Delroy "Delly" Golding - percussion
Oliver Chastan - executive producer
Barry O'Hare - producer
Romain "Sherkhan" Chiffre - production, guitars and mixing engineer
Ivan Evangelista - audio engineer
Jean Luc Cohen - mixing engineer
Tanya Stephens - writing/production

DVD
Andrew Henton - drums/production
Rick Sabo - guitar
Delroy "Delly" Golding - percussion
Oliver Chastan - executive producer/director
Alex Kane - director/camera operator
Barry O'Hare - producer
Sherkan - guitar
Ivan Evangelista - audio engineer
Tanya Stephens - writing/production

Chart History

References

Tanya Stephens albums
2006 albums